Way of the Wicked is a 2014 American horror film directed by Kevin Carraway and starring Christian Slater. The film had its Internet premiere on April 30, 2014 in China and was released onto DVD in the United States on May 20 of the same year. The story concerns a young boy who may or may not be the Anti-Christ.

Synopsis
When he was a child, Robbie (Jake Croker) tried to defend his friend Heather (Emily Tennant) from bullying classmates. The attempt ended with one of the bullies dying. Years later Robbie has returned to town and is keen on befriending Heather again, much to the ire of her classmate Greg (Aren Buchholz). However Robbie is also at the center of several strange fatalities in which every victim had an altercation of some sort with him prior to their deaths. Henry (Christian Slater), a defrocked priest, is convinced that Robbie is the Anti-Christ and is set on convincing John Elliott (Vinnie Jones), Heather's father, that Robbie is to blame for everything.

Cast
Vinnie Jones as John Elliott
Christian Slater as Henry
Emily Tennant as Heather
Jake Croker as Robbie
Aren Buchholz as Greg
Matthew Robert Kelly as Detective Fleming (as Matt Kelly)
Brittney Wilson as Cindy
Jedidiah Goodacre as Matt
Jillian Fargey as Elizabeth
Chris Shields as Teacher
Anna Galvin as Laura
Sydney Waack as Young Heather
Ryan Grantham as Young Robbie
Jason Burkart as Janitor
Bal Nagra as Boy #1

Production
Plans to film Way of the Wicked were announced in 2012. Rutger Hauer and Peter Facinelli were initially attached to star in the film along with Christian Slater. The initial plot description was different from the final product, and Hauer was to portray a priest assisting Facinelli, a detective trying to discover the whereabouts of a murderer. Slater was to star as Facinelli's boss. The initial script was written by Lawrence Salva, but was re-worked into a new script by Matthew Robert Kelly. Jones was later signed to portray detective John Elliott and Slater took on the role of Henry, a defrocked priest. Of filming, Carraway stated that he enjoyed working with Slater on the film and that Jones liked the chance to "play something a little different because he always plays the tough guy characters".

Reception
HorrorNews.net wrote a positive review for Way of the Wicked, as they felt that it was "one of the better horror movies that [they] have seen recently" and cited the film's cast as a highlight. In contrast, Ain't It Cool News panned the movie overall and cautioned readers to "steer clear of this bland witch/paranormal outing".

References

External links
 
 

2014 films
2014 horror films
Films shot in British Columbia
2010s English-language films